Failford is a locality in the Mid-Coast Council local government area on the Mid North Coast of New South Wales, Australia. At the 2011 census it had a population of 495.

Failford is a water skiing and boating location with the nearby Wallamba River, which runs between Nabiac and Tuncurry. It has a caravan park on the river with its own boatramp.

References

Suburbs of Mid-Coast Council